Ashampstead Common is a common in the English county of Berkshire, within the civil parish of Ashampstead.

The common lies north of the M4 motorway, near to Ashampstead, Lower Basildon and Yattendon.

Parks and open spaces in Berkshire
West Berkshire District